This Is New may refer to:
 This Is New (Dee Dee Bridgewater album), 2002
 This Is New (Kenny Drew album), 1957